A list of films produced in Egypt in 1980. For an A-Z list of films currently on Wikipedia, see :Category:Egyptian films.

External links
 Egyptian films of 1980 at the Internet Movie Database
 Egyptian films of 1980 elCinema.com

Lists of Egyptian films by year
1980 in Egypt
Lists of 1980 films by country or language